A relaxed K-d tree or relaxed K-dimensional tree is a data structure which is a variant of K-d trees.  Like K-dimensional trees, a relaxed K-dimensional tree stores a set of n-multidimensional records, each one having a unique K-dimensional key x=(x0,... ,xK−1). Unlike K-d trees, in a relaxed K-d tree, the discriminants in each node are arbitrary. Relaxed K-d trees were introduced in 1998.

Definitions 
A relaxed K-d tree for a set of K-dimensional keys is a binary tree in which:
 Each node contains a K-dimensional record and has associated an arbitrary discriminant j ∈ {0,1,...,K − 1}.
 For every node with key x and discriminant j, the following invariant is true: any record in the right subtree with key y satisfies yj < xj and any record in the left subtree with key y satisfies yj ≥ xj.

If K = 1, a relaxed K-d tree is a binary search tree.

As in a K-d tree, a relaxed K-d tree of size n induces a partition of the domain D into n+1 regions, each corresponding to a leaf in the K-d tree. The bounding box (or bounds array) of a node {x,j} is the region of the space delimited by the leaf in which x falls when it is inserted into the tree. Thus, the bounding box of the root {y,i} is [0,1]K, the bounding box of the left subtree's root is [0,1] × ... × [0,yi] × ... × [0,1], and so on.

Supported queries 
The average time complexities in a relaxed K-d tree with n records are:
 Exact match queries: O(log n)
 Partial match queries: O(n1−f(s/K)), where:
 s out of K attributes are specified
 with 0 < f(s/K) < 1, a real valued function of s/K
 Nearest neighbor queries: O(log n)

See also

 k-d tree
 implicit k-d tree, a k-d tree defined by an implicit splitting function rather than an explicitly-stored set of splits
 min/max k-d tree, a k-d tree that associates a minimum and maximum value with each of its nodes

References

Trees (data structures)